The Harley-Davidson Servi-Car was a three-wheeled utility motorcycle manufactured by Harley-Davidson from 1932 to 1973.

Concept and uses
The Servi-Car was designed during the Great Depression when Harley-Davidson was desperate to expand its product base to increase sales.  Targeted at the automotive service industry, the vehicle was designed to be towed behind a car to be delivered to a customer; when the car was delivered at its destination, the driver would unhitch the Servi-Car and ride back to the garage.  For this reason, it was available with a tow bar at the front and a large 60 Ah battery.

In addition to its intended use for car delivery and retrieval, the Servi-Car was also popular as a utility vehicle for small businesses and mobile vendors.   They proved to be particularly popular with the police departments, some of which still used Servi-Cars into the 1990s.

Models
The models offered in 1932, the first year of production were:
G - with small box and tow bar
GA - with small box and no tow bar
GD - with large box and no tow bar
GE - with large box and air tank

In 1933, the GDT, with large box and tow bar, was added to the line.

In 1942, the small and large boxes were replaced with a standardized intermediate-sized box that was manufactured for Harley-Davidson by the Chas. Abresch Co. in Milwaukee, Wisconsin.  A gold, red, and black water transfer decal from this company was affixed to the top inside of the box lid. This box lasted until 1966, after which it was replaced by a fiberglass box; all preceding boxes were made from steel.

Engine
The Servi-Car used variations of Harley-Davidson's 45 cubic inch flathead. From 1932 to 36, the Servi-Car used the engine from the solo R model.  It was changed in 1937 to the engine used in the W model, which differed mainly in having a recirculating oil system instead of the constant-loss system of the R. The "W" flathead engine continued until the end of production in 1973, despite the "W" solo series being replaced by the "K" series in 1952.

An electric starter became available on the Servi-Car in 1964, making it the first civilian Harley with an electric starter, one year before the debut of the Electra Glide.

Transmission
When the Servi-Car was introduced in 1932, it used the same transmission as the R solo model.  This was replaced the next year by a constant-mesh transmission with three speeds and a reverse gear.

Chassis and suspension

The Servi-Car was designed for the road conditions of the day, where surface roads might still be crude and unpaved. It had a rigid rear axle with a differential. This was done so that the vehicle could use the same tracks that had been made by regular cars.

A prototype of the Servi-Car with rear suspension had been tested and was found to be unstable.  The production model had its axle mounted directly to the frame with no suspension at all.

Until 1957, the front forks of the Servi-Car were the springer-type leading-link forks used on the R-series and W-series solo motorcycles.  From 1958 on, the Servi-Car changed neck stem length and inner diameter to use Hydra-Glide front forks.

Brakes
As introduced, the Servi-Car had a drum brake on the front wheel and another drum brake inside the rear axle housing, decelerating both rear wheels.  In 1937, the braking system was upgraded to have a drum brake on each wheel.  A hydraulic rear brake system was introduced in 1951. The very last Servi-Cars, built late in their last model year, would have disc brakes on all three wheels.

See also

List of Harley-Davidson motorcycles
List of motorized trikes
List of motorcycles of the 1930s

References

Servi-Car
Tricycle motorcycles
Motorcycles introduced in the 1930s